The 2012 West Virginia gubernatorial election was held on November 6, 2012, to elect the governor of West Virginia. Democratic incumbent Earl Ray Tomblin, who was elected governor in a special election in 2011, was elected to a full four-year term. The election was a rematch of the 2011 special election.

Democratic primary

Candidates
 Arne Moltis, candidate for governor in 2011
 Earl Ray Tomblin, incumbent governor

Declined
 Jeff Kessler, state senator, president of the state senate, and candidate for governor in 2011
 Brooks McCabe, state senator

Results

Republican primary

Candidates
 Ralph William Clark, philosophy professor at West Virginia University and candidate for governor in 2011
 Bill Maloney, businessman and Republican nominee for governor in 2011

Declined
 Clark Barnes, state senator and candidate for governor in 2011 (did not file)
 Mark Sorsaia, Putnam County prosecutor and candidate for governor in 2011 (did not file)
 Mike Stuart, West Virginia Republican Party chairman

Results

General election

Candidates
 Jesse Johnson (Mountain), former gubernatorial and senate nominee
 Bill Maloney (R), businessman and Republican nominee for governor in 2011
 David Moran (Libertarian), farmer and retired engineer
 Earl Ray Tomblin (D), incumbent governor

Other potential candidates
 Norman Ferguson (NPA)
 Phil Hudok (Constitution), write-in candidate for governor in 2011

Debates
Complete video of debate, October 9, 2012 - C-SPAN

Predictions

Polling

Results

References

External links
Elections Division at the West Virginia secretary of state
Candidate sites (Archived)
 Bill Maloney for Governor
 Earl Ray Tomblin for Governor
 David Moran for Governor

2012
West Virginia
Gubernatorial